Maestro is a 2008 reality TV talent show-themed television series produced by the BBC's Classical Music Department in the United Kingdom. It was shown on BBC Two between 12 August and 13 September 2008.

The show features eight celebrities (described by the BBC as "famous amateurs with a passion for classical music") competing for the chance to conduct the BBC Concert Orchestra at the 2008 Proms in the Park at Hyde Park in London on 13 September 2008 as part of the BBC Proms series Last Night of the Proms. The show was presented by Clive Anderson.

Format
The aim for each of the students is to prove that they have what it takes to conduct a piece in the London section of Proms in the Park.

The first stage of preparation was a week-long "Baton Camp" for the students in the last week of May. A mentor has been assigned to each student (see below). The mentors are all established professional conductors, and each will work with their respective protégés, helping them to master the disciplines of orchestral, choral and operatic music with Soprano, Rebecca Evans and Tenor, Alfie Boe. Rehearsals continue throughout the summer, with the students learning how to inspire and engage with the orchestra and the music.

In August the students conduct in the weekly show, which is broadcast on BBC Two in front of a studio audience and an international judging panel made up of acknowledged experts in the field. The contestants conduct the BBC Concert Orchestra (and also learn how to conduct a large choir – in this case, the BBC Symphony Chorus). Each week, one student is eliminated: the marks of the judging panel determine the two weakest contestants, and members of the BBC Concert Orchestra then vote to decide who stays and who must go.

Judging panel
The panel is led by conductor Sir Roger Norrington (who conducted the Last Night of the Proms 2008 at the Royal Albert Hall), and comprises composer and cellist Zoë Martlew, conductor Simone Young and double bassist Dominic Seldis. In the final programme (9 September), a guest judge, the Russian violinist and conductor Maxim Vengerov stood in for Simone Young, who had a prior engagement.

International versions
 Franchise with a currently airing season
 Franchise with an upcoming season
 Franchise with an unknown status
 Franchise that had ceased to air

Contestants and eliminations
The following table (containing the contestants along with their mentors) shows the scores obtained each episode by each contestant, along with those who were eliminated (red), and those who were eligible for elimination, but survived (yellow):

References

External links
 

2008 British television series debuts
2008 British television series endings
2000s British reality television series
BBC high definition shows
BBC reality television shows
English-language television shows